Ronnie Amir Aguilar Romero (born June 24, 1987) is an American professional basketball player last played in China Hainan Jinxing Basketball Club. Formasa Dreamers in Taiwan. Also for Al-Nweidrat of the Bahraini Premier League. He played college basketball for Colorado State and senior year at Cal State Dominguez Hills.

Early life and career
Ronnie Amir Aguilar was born in Los Angeles. Was born to a father from El Salvador and a mother from Honduras. He attended John Marshall High School and was the first In Marshall's History to become an all American with a D1 scholarship. Played his first two years of college basketball for Colorado State.

In 2009, Aguilar transferred to Cal State Dominguez Hills. He started 39 games out of 39 played in two years at Dominguez Hills, averaging 18.4 points and 14.8 rebounds per contest. As a senior, Aguilar helped the Toros set five records that included a 16–1 start, defeating the No. 1 team in the nation, a No. 4 ranking by the NABC, and 10-game win streak and 23 wins in a single season, before being ushered out of the NCAA postseason by BYU-Hawaii, whom the Toros bested during the regular season.

Professional career
Between November and December 2011, Aguilar played six games in the NBA Development League for the Bakersfield Jam, averaging 2.2 points and 4.2 rebounds in 5.9 minutes per game.

On September 27, 2012, Aguilar signed with the Los Angeles Lakers, waived on October 20.

On January 26, 2013, Aguilar signed with Venezuelan club Trotamundos de Carabobo.

In November 2013, Aguilar spent training camp with the Bakersfield Jam.

On March 13, 2016, Aguilar was acquired by the Dallas Mavericks Texas Legends of the NBA Development League. Four days later, he made his debut for the Legends in a 107–105 loss to the Bakersfield Jam, recording one rebound in two minutes off the bench.

In January 2018, Aguilar, sign with Taiwanese basketball team Formosa Dreamers of the ASEAN Basketball League. He replaced Reggie Okosa, who only played two games for the club.

On October 28, 2018, Aguilar signed with Al-Nweidrat of the Bahraini Premier League.

National team career
In 2013, Aguilar led the El Salvador national basketball team to their first medal in international basketball, a silver medal in the 2013 FIBA COCABA Championship. He returned to play for them in 2015, and took them to their first pre-Olympic world tournament in history.

References

External links
Colorado State Rams bio
Ronnie Aguilar at fiba.com

1987 births
Living people
American expatriate basketball people in Taiwan
American men's basketball players
American people of Honduran descent
American sportspeople of Salvadoran descent
ASEAN Basketball League players
Bakersfield Jam players
Basketball players from Los Angeles
Cal State Dominguez Hills Toros men's basketball players
Centers (basketball)
Colorado State Rams men's basketball players
Citizens of El Salvador through descent
Salvadoran basketball players
Texas Legends players
Trotamundos B.B.C. players
Formosa Dreamers players